Welch Hall is a historic residence located at 24 E Stewart Rd on Oak Hill in Columbia, Missouri. The residence is home to the University of Missouri chapter of Alpha Sigma Phi but was previously owned by Sigma Alpha Epsilon. The site was recognized by the Columbia Historic Preservation Commission as one of the city's Most Notable Historic Properties in 2004. It was nominated for the National Register of Historic Places in 2014.

Early history
The original house on Oak Hill was platted in Columbia in 1820, and later served as a hospital during the Civil War era.

Military Academy

In the late 19th century, Oak Hill became home to the University Military Academy, sometimes known as Welch Military Academy. The now defunct Military Academy was chartered in 1894 and operated by John B. Welch. The academy advertised its mission to prepare young men with thorough preparation for Yale, Harvard, West Point or business. The academy originally occupied twenty acres centered on an elevated hilltop near the western edge of the University of Missouri. It is believed that the Academy played football in the 20th century.  One game that is documented in the Missouri State Historical Society Newspaper Archives was played between Columbia High School (now Hickman High School) and the Academy in 1901.  The final score documented is 24-0 in favor of Columbia High School. The academy's original building was destroyed by fire in October 1907.

In 1908, construction was completed on a new structure built on same site to replace the structure lost to the fire. Welch continued to operate his military academy in the new building until he retired in 1915.

Women's Dormitory
According to the 1922 Savitar (University of Missouri Yearbook), Welch Hall was leased, remodeled, and furnished by the Women's Student Government Association (W.S.G.A.) in the 1920-21 Academic year.  It was able to be occupied by the holiday season that year.  It was designed to be a co-operative house, the girls living there had direct control of the house under the supervision of the W.S.G.A.

Oak Hill Hotel
In 1926, the building ceased operations as a dormitory, because Mrs. Welch sold the property to local real estate developer Judge Stewart and his sons. They converted the property to a hotel and campground known as Oak Hill Hotel. Sigma Alpha Epsilon purchased the property from Stewart on April 29, 1929.

Fraternity

Sigma Alpha Epsilon acquired the main building and a significant portion of the surrounding land of Oak Hill in 1929. Renovation of the hotel into a fraternity house was completed in 1929 under the direction of architect David Frederick Wallace. During the Wallace renovation, the dark brick walls were painted white, the facade was greatly expanded with the addition of large open side porches, a formal brick wall was added across the front edge of the yard, and Neo-Classical detailing was added to a rebuilt central front portico.

Fire destroyed the roof and much of the interior of the structure in 1965 while in possession of SAE, but the house was rebuilt almost exactly and was rededicated in September 1966. SAE continued to occupy Welch Hall for the rest of the century.

On April 3, 2008 Sigma Alpha Epsilon was suspended by the university for a minimum of four years following a long history of disciplinary violations. As a result of the suspension of its Missouri chapter, the SAE house corporation agreed to lease Welch Hall to the Missouri chapter of Acacia fraternity. The parties agreed on a two-year lease with the option of adding an additional two-year extension. Acacia took possession of the property on June 1 of that year. Acacia was unable to fulfill lease conditions, and the fraternity vacated the property in the first year of the lease. The Missouri chapter of Tau Kappa Epsilon then leased the property beginning in 2009 until SAE returned to campus following their suspension. SAE fraternity returned to the house in the summer of 2012, but was once again suspended in 2018. The Missouri chapter of Alpha Sigma Phi currently has a five-year lease on the property as of 2019.

Haunting
Prior to the house's use as a military academy beginning in the early 1890s, the original structure once served as a Civil War hospital. Although fire destroyed much of the upper floors in 1907 and 1965, much of the basement remains original to the Civil War hospital, including areas that once housed a crematorium and morgue. According to legend, the bodies of dead soldiers were stored in the basement. One story of the supposed hauntings involves a 1947 SAE pledge class. According to the legend, the pledges "experienced supernatural things" within the house after they were forced to spend the night in the basement.  Soon after the experience, they all dropped out of MU and never returned to Columbia.

In keeping with the traditions, legends, and history of the building, the fall pledge class of Sigma Alpha Epsilon began transforming the property into a haunted house as an annual Halloween tradition beginning in 1986.

References

University of Missouri campus
Defunct United States military academies
Fraternity and sorority houses
Residential buildings in Missouri
Sigma Alpha Epsilon